Chlorissa is a genus of moths in the family Geometridae erected by James Francis Stephens in 1831.

Species
 Chlorissa albistrigulata Warren, 1897
 Chlorissa amphitritaria (Oberthür, 1879)
 Chlorissa anadema (Prout, 1930)
 Chlorissa arkitensis Viidalepp, 1988
 Chlorissa asphaleia Wiltshire, 1966
 Chlorissa cloraria (Hübner, [1813])
 Chlorissa discessa Walker, 1861
 Chlorissa etruscaria (Zeller, 1849)
 Chlorissa faustinata (Millière, 1868)
 Chlorissa gelida (Butler, 1889)
 Chlorissa gigantaria (Staudinger, 1892)
 Chlorissa macrotyro Inoue, 1954
 Chlorissa obliterata (Walker, 1863)
 Chlorissa pretiosaria (Staudinger, 1877)
 Chlorissa rubrifrons (Warren, 1894)
 Chlorissa sachalinensis (Matsumura, 1925)
 Chlorissa talvei Viidalepp, 1988
 Chlorissa vermiculata Warren, 1897
 Chlorissa viridata (Linnaeus, 1758) – small grass emerald

References

Hemitheini